The Traisen (pronunciation in local German dialect ) is a river in Lower Austria.

The Traisen is formed from the rivers Türnitzer Traisen and Unrechttraisen. It is a tributary of the Danube in the Lower Austrian region of Mostviertel. Its two sources begin near St. Aegyd am Neuwalde and Türnitz respectively. After meeting, they flow through the municipalities of Türnitz, Lilienfeld, Traisen, Wilhelmsburg, and St. Pölten, before meeting the Danube at Traismauer.

During a period of extremely high water in July 1997, parts of numerous municipalities along the Traisen, as well as the government quarter of the state capital St. Pölten, were greatly flooded.

References

External links

Rivers of Lower Austria
Sankt Pölten
Rivers of Austria